Kepnock is a suburb of Bundaberg in the Bundaberg Region, Queensland, Australia.

Geography 
Kepnoch is almost entirely a residential area, with small convenience stores along Elliot Heads Road.

History 
Kepnock State High School opened on 28 January 1964.

At the  Kepnock had a population of 4,533 people.

Education 

Kepnock State High School is a government secondary (7-12) school for boys and girls at Kepnock Road. In 2017, the school had an enrolment of 1,365 students with 114 teachers (105 full-time equivalent) and 58 non-teaching staff (42 full-time equivalent). In 2018, the school had an enrolment of 1,354 students with 120 teachers (110 full-time equivalent) and 60 non-teaching staff (43 full-time equivalent). The school offers a special education program.

There are no primary schools in Kepnock. The nearest government primary school is Bundaberg East State School in neighbouring Bundaberg East to the north.

Amenities 
There are a number of parks in the suburb, including:

 CJ Neilson Park
 Clive Cresent Park

 Fe Walker Street Park

 Quinn Street Park

 Scotton Street Park

 Stehbens Park

References

External links 

 

Suburbs of Bundaberg